Taraklı, formerly known as Dablar is a historic district in northwestern Turkey. It is surrounded by forest and located approximately midway between Istanbul and Ankara in the Sakarya Province of the Marmara region. The district governor is Ömer Yılmaz, and the mayor is Tacettin Özkaraman (AKP).

A member of the Cittaslow movement, Tarakli features cobblestone streets and architecture dating back to the Ottoman Empire.  The town has undergone extensive renovations and has gained attention as a tourist destination. A local bazaar offers handmade crafts like wooden combs and spoons. Nearby attractions include thermal springs, the Karagöl Plateau, and Hark Canyon and Cave.

The Yunus Pasha Mosque, built in 1517 by Ottoman architect Mimar Sinan, lies at the center of Tarakli. It was built with molten lead and heated from below with steam from an adjacent public bath.

References

Populated places in Sakarya Province
Cittaslow
Districts of Sakarya Province